Frenchette is a restaurant in TriBeCa, New York City which opened in April 2018. It won the James Beard Foundation Award as Best New Restaurant in 2019. It is owned by chefs Riad Nasr and Lee Hanson and is named for David Johansen's 1978 song "Frenchette". The menu includes a mix of modern and traditional French with dishes like escargots, tortilla espanola and spaghetti with shaved bottarga.

Nasr and Hanson worked together since 1997 at Keith McNally's restaurants, Balthazar, Pastis and Minetta Tavern, before opening Frenchette.

References

External links

Restaurants in Manhattan
James Beard Foundation Award winners
Tribeca
2018 establishments in New York City
2010s in Manhattan
Restaurants established in 2018
French restaurants in New York City